Beyneu District is a district of Mangystau Region in south-western Kazakhstan. The administrative center of the district is the auyl of Beyneu. The district's population was 68,285 in 2018. The Census population in 2009 was 46,937 and in 1999 had been 26,548.

Geography
The territory of the district is occupied by the eastern edge of the Caspian lowland with sands and salt marshes (Dead Kultuk, etc.), the eastern part is the Ustyurt Plateau with the Mynsualmas hill. Reserves of petroleum and gas, shell rock, and construction sands have been explored in the depths. The climate is continental. The average temperature in January is -4 °C, July 25-27 °C. Precipitation falls 120-130 mm per year. Sandstorms are frequent. The vegetation is semi-desert: halophytes, artemisia (plant), haloxyl thickets in places. There are saiga antelopes, goitered gazelle, hare, wolf, fox, rodents and others.

History
It was formed in 1973. In 1988-1990, during the abolition of the Mangyshlak region, it was part of the Guryev region.

References

Districts of Kazakhstan
Mangystau Region